The 1896 Penn Quakers football team represented the University of Pennsylvania in the 1896 college football season. The Quakers finished with a 14–1 record in their fifth year under head coach and College Football Hall of Fame inductee, George Washington Woodruff. Significant games included victories over Navy (8–0), Carlisle (21–0), Penn State (27–0), Harvard (8–6), and Cornell (32–10), and its sole loss against undefeated national champion Lafayette (6–4).  The 1896 Penn team outscored its opponents by a combined total of 326 to 24.

Five Penn players received recognition on the 1896 College Football All-America Team: end Charlie Gelbert (consensus 1st team); guards Charles Wharton (consensus 1st team), Wylie G. Woodruff (consensus 1st team), and L. J. Uffenheimer (Leslie's Weekly, 2nd team); and fullback John Minds (Philadelphia Inquirer, 1st team).

Schedule

References

Penn
Penn Quakers football seasons
Penn Quakers football